J. Frederick Kelly (1888–1947) was an American architect who has designed significant houses.  Kelly was regarded as the leading architectural historian in Connecticut.

Kelly's work includes three properties listed on the U.S. National Register of Historic Places, whose restoration or construction he is associated with:
Nehemiah Royce House, 538 N. Main St., Wallingford, Connecticut
Henry Whitfield House, 248 Old Whitfield St., Guilford, Connecticut
470 Livingston Street, a Colonial Revival house which is a contributing property in the Whitney Avenue Historic District, New Haven, CT

Kelly's writings include:
Early Connecticut Meetinghouses, Volumes 1 & 2, 1948.  New York: Columbia University Press.
Early Domestic Architecture of Connecticut', 1924. New Haven: Yale University Press.

References

20th-century American architects
1947 deaths
1888 births